Roger Williams ( 21st December, 16031st April, 1683) was an English-born New England Puritan minister, theologian, and author who founded Providence Plantations, which became the Colony of Rhode Island and Providence Plantations and later the U.S. State of Rhode Island and Providence Plantations, now the State of Rhode Island. He was a staunch advocate for religious freedom, separation of church and state, and fair dealings with Native Americans.

Williams was expelled by the Puritan leaders from the Massachusetts Bay Colony and established Providence Plantations in 1636 as a refuge offering what he termed "liberty of conscience". In 1638, he founded the First Baptist Church in America, in Providence. Williams studied the indigenous languages of New England and published the first book-length study of a native North American language in English.

Early life
Roger Williams was born in London, England, with many historians citing 1603 as the probable year of his birth. The exact details of Williams' birth are unknown as his birth records were destroyed when St. Sepulchre's Church burned during the Great Fire of London. His father was James Williams (1562–1620), a merchant tailor in Smithfield, and his mother was Alice Pemberton (1564–1635).

At an early age, Williams had a spiritual conversion, of which his father disapproved. As an adolescent, he apprenticed under Sir Edward Coke (1552–1634), the famous jurist, and was educated at Charterhouse School under Coke's patronage. Williams later attended Pembroke College, Cambridge, where he received a Bachelor of Arts in 1627. Williams demonstrated a facility with languages, acquiring familiarity with Latin, Hebrew, Greek, Dutch, and French at an early age. Years later, he tutored John Milton in Dutch and Native American languages in exchange for refresher lessons in Hebrew. 

Williams took holy orders in the Church of England in connection with his studies, but he became a Puritan at Cambridge and thus ruined his chance for preferment in the Anglican church. After graduating from Cambridge, he became the chaplain to Sir William Masham. In April 1629, Williams proposed marriage to Jane Whalley, the niece of Lady Joan (Cromwell) Barrington, but she declined. Later that year, he married Mary Bernard (1609–76), the daughter of Rev. Richard Bernard, a notable Puritan preacher and author, at the Church of High Laver, in Epping Forest, a few miles east of London. Together Mary and Roger had six children, all born in America: Mary, Freeborn, Providence, Mercy, Daniel, and Joseph.

Williams knew that Puritan leaders planned to migrate to the New World. He did not join the first wave of settlers, but later decided that he could not remain in England under the administration of Archbishop William Laud. Williams regarded the Church of England as corrupt and false, and he had arrived at the Separatist position by 1630; on December 1, Williams and his wife boarded the Boston-bound Lyon in Bristol.

First years in America

Arrival in Boston 
On 5 February 1631, the Lyon anchored in Nantasket, outside of the Puritan settlement of Boston. Upon his arrival, the church of Boston offered Williams the opportunity to serve during the vacancy of Rev. John Wilson, who had returned to England to accompany his wife to the colony. Williams declined the position on grounds that it was "an unseparated church." In addition, he asserted that civil magistrates must not punish any sort of "breach of the first table" of the Ten Commandments such as idolatry, Sabbath-breaking, false worship, and blasphemy, and that individuals should be free to follow their own convictions in religious matters. These three principles later became central tenets of Williams' teachings and writings.

Salem and Plymouth

As a Separatist, Williams considered the Church of England irredeemably corrupt and believed that one must completely separate from it to establish a new church for the true and pure worship of God. The Salem church was also inclined to Separatism, and they invited him to become their teacher. In response, leaders in Boston vigorously protested, leading Salem to withdraw its offer. As the summer of 1631 ended, Williams moved to Plymouth Colony where he was welcomed, and informally assisted the minister. At Plymouth, he regularly preached; according to the colony's governor, William Bradford, "his teachings were well approved."

After a time, Williams decided that the Plymouth church was not sufficiently separated from the Church of England. Furthermore, his contact with the Narragansett Indians had caused him to question the validity of colonial charters that did not include legitimate purchase of Indian land. Governor Bradford later wrote that Williams fell "into some strange opinions which caused some controversy between the church and him."

In December 1632, Williams wrote a lengthy tract that openly condemned the King's charters and questioned the right of Plymouth to the land without first buying it from the Native Americans. He even charged that King James had uttered a "solemn lie" in claiming that he was the first Christian monarch to have discovered the land. Williams moved back to Salem by the fall of 1633 and was welcomed by Rev. Samuel Skelton as an unofficial assistant.

Litigation and exile

The Massachusetts Bay authorities were not pleased at Williams' return. In December 1633, they summoned him to appear before the General Court in Boston to defend his tract attacking the King and the charter. The issue was smoothed out, and the tract disappeared forever, probably burned. In August 1634, Williams became acting pastor of the Salem church, the Rev. Skelton having died. In March 1635, he was again ordered to appear before the General Court, and he was summoned yet again for the Court's July term to answer for "erroneous" and "dangerous opinions." The Court finally ordered that he be removed from his church position.

This latest controversy welled up as the town of Salem petitioned the General Court to annex some land on Marblehead Neck. The Court refused to consider the request unless the church in Salem removed Williams. The church felt that this order violated their independence, and sent a letter of protest to the other churches. However, the letter was not read publicly in those churches, and the General Court refused to seat the delegates from Salem at the next session. Support for Williams began to wane under this pressure, and he withdrew from the church and began meeting with a few of his most devoted followers in his home.

Finally, in October 1635, the General Court tried Williams and convicted him of sedition and heresy. They declared that he was spreading "diverse, new, and dangerous opinions" and ordered that he be banished. The execution of the order was delayed because Williams was ill and winter was approaching, so he was allowed to stay temporarily, provided that he ceased publicly teaching his opinions. He did not comply with this demand, and the sheriff came in January 1636, only to discover that he had slipped away three days earlier during a blizzard. He traveled 55 miles through the deep snow, from Salem to Raynham, Massachusetts where the local Wampanoags offered him shelter at their winter camp. Sachem Massasoit hosted Williams there for the three months until spring.

Settlement at Providence

In the spring of 1636, Williams and a number of others from Salem began a new settlement on land which he had bought from Massasoit in Rumford, Rhode Island. After settling however, authorities of Plymouth Colony asserted that Williams and his followers were within their land grant and expressed concern that his presence there might anger the leaders of Massachusetts Bay Colony.

Accordingly, Williams, accompanied by Thomas Angell crossed the Seekonk River, in search of a new location suitable for settlement. Upon reaching the shore, Williams and Angell were met by indigenous Narragansett people who greeted them with the words "What cheer, Netop". The settlers then continued eastward along the Providence River, where they encountered a cove and freshwater spring. Finding the area suitable for settlement, Williams acquired the tract from sachems Canonicus and Miantonomi. Here, Williams and his followers established a new, permanent settlement. Under the belief that divine providence had brought them there, the settlers named the settlement "Providence."

Williams wanted his settlement to be a haven for those "distressed of conscience," and it soon attracted a collection of dissenters and otherwise-minded individuals. From the beginning, a majority vote of the heads of households governed the new settlement, but only in civil things. Newcomers could also be admitted to full citizenship by a majority vote. In August 1637, a new town agreement again restricted the government to civil things. In 1640, 39 freemen (men who had full citizenship and voting rights) signed another agreement that declared their determination "still to hold forth liberty of conscience." Thus, Williams founded the first place in modern history where citizenship and religion were separate, providing religious liberty and separation of church and state. This was combined with the principle of majoritarian democracy.

In November 1637, the General Court of Massachusetts disarmed, disenfranchised, and forced into exile some of the Antinomians, including the followers of Anne Hutchinson. John Clarke was among them, and he learned from Williams that Aquidneck (Rhode) Island might be purchased from the Narragansetts; Williams helped him to make the purchase, along with William Coddington and others, and they established the settlement of Portsmouth. In spring 1638, some of those settlers split away and founded the nearby settlement of Newport, also situated on Aquidneck Island.

In 1638, Williams and about twelve others were baptized and formed a congregation. Today, Williams' congregation is recognized as the First Baptist Church in America.

Pequot War and relations with Native Americans

In the meantime, the Pequot War had broken out. Massachusetts Bay asked for Williams' help, which he gave despite his exile, and he became the Bay colony's eyes and ears, and also dissuaded the Narragansetts from joining with the Pequots. Instead, the Narragansetts allied themselves with the colonists and helped to defeat the Pequots in 1637–38. The Narragansetts thus became the most powerful Native American tribe in southern New England.

Williams formed firm friendships and developed deep trust among the Native American tribes, especially the Narragansetts. He was able to keep the peace between the Native Americans and the Colony of Rhode Island and Providence Plantations for nearly 40 years by his constant mediation and negotiation. He twice surrendered himself as a hostage to the Native Americans to guarantee the safe return of a great sachem from a summons to a court: Pessicus in 1645 and Metacom ("King Philip") in 1671. Williams was trusted by the Native Americans more than any other Colonist, and he proved trustworthy.

However, the other New England colonies began to fear and mistrust the Narragansetts and soon came to regard the Rhode Island colony as a common enemy. In the next three decades, Massachusetts, Connecticut, and Plymouth exerted pressure to destroy both Rhode Island and the Narragansetts. In 1643, the neighboring colonies formed a military alliance called the United Colonies which pointedly excluded the towns around Narragansett Bay. In response, Williams traveled to England to secure a charter for the colony.

Return to England and charter matters

A Key into the Language of America 
Williams arrived in London in the midst of the English Civil War. Puritans held power in London, and he was able to obtain a charter through the offices of Sir Henry Vane the Younger, despite strenuous opposition from Massachusetts' agents. His first published book A Key into the Language of America proved crucial to the success of his charter, albeit indirectly. Published in 1643 in London, the book combined a phrase-book with observations about life and culture as an aid to communicate with the Native Americans of New England. In its scope, the book covered everything from salutations to death and burial. Williams also sought to correct the attitudes of superiority displayed by the colonists towards Native Americans:

Printed by Gregory Dexter, the book was the first book-length study of a native North American language in the English language. In England, the book was well received by readers who were curious about the indigenous people of the New World.

The Bloudy Tenent 
Williams secured his charter from Parliament for Providence Plantations in July 1644, after which he published his most famous book The Bloudy Tenent of Persecution for Cause of Conscience. The publication produced a great uproar; between 1644 and 1649, at least 60 pamphlets were published addressing the work's arguments. Parliament responded to Williams on August 9, 1644, by ordering the public hangman to burn all copies. By this time, however, Williams was already en route to New England, where he arrived with his charter in September.
It took Williams several years to unify the settlements of Narragansett Bay under a single government given the opposition of William Coddington. The four villages finally united in 1647 into the Colony of Rhode Island and Providence Plantations. Freedom of conscience was again proclaimed, and the colony became a safe haven for people who were persecuted for their beliefs, including Baptists, Quakers, and Jews. Still, the divisions between the towns' powerful personalities did not bode well for the colony. Coddington disliked Williams and did not enjoy his position of subordination under the new charter government. Accordingly, Coddington sailed to England and returned to Rhode Island in 1651 with his own patent making him "Governor for Life" over Aquidneck and Conanicut Islands.

As a result, Providence, Warwick, and Coddington's opponents on Aquidneck dispatched Roger Williams and John Clarke to England, seeking to cancel Coddington's commission. Williams sold his trading post at Cocumscussec (near Wickford, Rhode Island) to pay for his journey even though it provided his primary source of income. Williams and Clarke succeeded in rescinding Coddington's patent, with Clarke remaining in England for the following decade to protect the colonists' interests and secure a new charter. Williams returned to America in 1654 and was immediately elected the colony's president. He subsequently served in many offices in town and colonial governments.

Slavery 
Williams did not write extensively about slavery. He consistently expressed disapproval of perpetual chattel slavery, though generally did not object to the enslavement of captured enemy combatants for a fixed duration, a practice from which he occasionally profited. During his life, Williams struggled with the morality of slavery and raised his concerns in letters to Massachusetts Bay Governor John Winthrop concerning the treatment of the Pequots during the Pequot War (1636–1638). In these letters, he requested Winthrop to prevent the enslavement of Pequot women and children as well as direct the colonial militia to spare them during the fighting.

In another letter to Winthrop written on July 31, 1637, Williams stated that he approved of the capture and indenture of remaining Pequot women and children in order to "lawfully" ensure that remaining enemy combatants were "weakned and despoild", but pleaded that their indenture not be permanent.

Despite his reservations, Williams formed part of the colonial delegation sent to conduct negotiations at the end of the Pequot War, where the fates of the captured Pequot were decided upon between the colonists of New England and their indigenous allies: the Narragansett, Mohegan, and Niantic. Williams reported to Winthrop that he and the Narragansett sachem Miantonomoh discussed what to do with a group of captured Pequot; initially they discussed the possibility of distributing them as slaves amongst the four victorious parties, which Miantonomoh "liked well", though at Williams' suggestion, the non-combatants were relocated to an island in Niantic territory "because most of them were families". Miantonomoh later requested an enslaved female Pequot from Winthrop, to which Williams objected, stating that "he had his share sent to him". Instead, Williams suggested he "buy one or two of some English man". While some indigenous allies of the colonists aided in the export of enslaved Pequot to the West Indies, others disagreed with the practice, instead believing that they should have been given land and provisions to contribute to the wellbeing of colonial settlements, as was their customary tradition concerning slavery. Many enslaved Pequot frequently ran away, where they were taken in by surrounding indigenous settlements; Williams, as part of his constant mediation between colonists and indigenous peoples, negotiated for the return of runaway Pequots and facilitated the trade of indigenous slaves.

In 1641, the Massachusetts Bay Colony passed laws sanctioning slavery. In response, under Williams' leadership, the Providence Plantations passed a law in 1652 restricting the amount of time for which an individual could be held in slavery and tried to prevent the importation of enslaved Africans. The law established terms for slavery that mirrored that of indentured servitude; enslavement was to be limited in duration and not passed down to children. Upon the unification of Providence Plantations with Aquidneck Island, residents of the latter refused to accept this law, ensuring it became dead letter. Later in life, at the time of King Phillip's War, tensions with the Narragansetts were irreparable, and, despite Williams' efforts to maintain peace, a destructive war ensued, during which his home was burned to the ground. During the war, Williams, with a group of Providence citizens, facilitated and profited from the sale of a number of captured Narragansetts and Wamponoag.

Relations with the Baptists 
Ezekiel Holliman baptized Williams in late 1638. A few years later, Dr. John Clarke established the First Baptist Church in Newport, Rhode Island, and both Roger Williams and John Clarke became the founders of the Baptist faith in America. Williams did not affiliate himself with any church, but he remained interested in the Baptists, agreeing with their rejection of infant baptism and most other matters. Both enemies and admirers sometimes called him a "Seeker," associating him with a heretical movement that accepted Socinianism and Universal Reconciliation, but Williams rejected both of these ideas.

King Philip's War and death

King Philip's War (1675–1676) pitted the colonists against indigenous peoples—including the Narragansett with which Williams had previously maintained good relations. Williams, although in his 70s, was elected captain of Providence's militia. On March 29, 1676, Narragansett warriors led by Canonchet burned Providence; among the structures destroyed were Williams' home.

Burial 
Williams died sometime between January 16 and March 16, 1683, and was buried on his own property. Fifty years later, his house collapsed into the cellar and the location of his grave was forgotten.

According to the National Park Service, in 1860, Providence residents determined to raise a monument in his honor "dug up the spot where they believed the remains to be, they found only nails, teeth, and bone fragments. They also found an apple tree root," which they thought followed the shape of a human body; the root followed the shape of a spine, split at the hips, bent at the knees, and turned up at the feet.

The Rhode Island Historical Society has cared for this tree root since 1860 as representative of Rhode Island's founder. Since 2007, the root has been displayed at the John Brown House.

The few remains discovered alongside the root were reinterred in Prospect Terrace Park in 1939 at the base of a large stone monument.

Separation of church and state

Williams was a staunch advocate of separation of church and state. He was convinced that civil government had no basis for meddling in matters of religious belief. He declared that the state should concern itself only with matters of civil order, not with religious belief, and he rejected any attempt by civil authorities to enforce the "first Table" of the Ten Commandments, those commandments that deal with an individual's relationship with and belief in God. Williams believed that the state must confine itself to the commandments dealing with the relations between people: murder, theft, adultery, lying, and honoring parents. Williams wrote of a "hedge or wall of Separation between the Garden of the Church and the Wilderness of the world." Thomas Jefferson later used the metaphor in his 1801 Letter to Danbury Baptists.

Williams considered the state's sponsor of religious beliefs or practice "forced worship", declaring "Forced worship stinks in God's nostrils." He also believed Constantine the Great to be a worse enemy to Christianity than Nero because the subsequent state involvement in religious matters corrupted Christianity and led to the death of the first Christian church and the first Christian communities. He described the attempt of the state to pass laws concerning an individual's religious beliefs as "rape of the soul" and spoke of the "oceans of blood" shed as a result of trying to command conformity. The moral principles in the Scriptures ought to inform the civil magistrates, he believed, but he observed that well-ordered, just, and civil governments existed even where Christianity was not present. Thus, all governments had to maintain civil order and justice, but Williams decided that none had a warrant to promote or repress any religious views. Most of his contemporaries criticized his ideas as a prescription for chaos and anarchy, and the vast majority believed that each nation must have its national church and could require that dissenters conform.

Writings

Williams's career as an author began with A Key into the Language of America (London, 1643), written during his first voyage to England. His next publication was Mr. Cotton's Letter lately Printed, Examined and Answered (London, 1644; reprinted in Publications of the Narragansett Club, vol. ii, along with John Cotton's letter which it answered). His most famous work is The Bloudy Tenent of Persecution for Cause of Conscience (published in 1644), considered by some to be one of the best defenses of liberty of conscience.

An anonymous pamphlet was published in London in 1644 entitled Queries of Highest Consideration Proposed to Mr. Tho. Goodwin, Mr. Phillip Nye, Mr. Wil. Bridges, Mr. Jer. Burroughs, Mr. Sidr. Simpson, all Independents, etc. which is now ascribed to Williams. These "Independents" were members of the Westminster Assembly; their Apologetical Narration sought a way between extreme Separatism and Presbyterianism, and their prescription was to accept the state church model of Massachusetts Bay.

Williams published The Bloody Tenent yet more Bloudy: by Mr. Cotton's Endeavor to wash it white in the Blood of the Lamb; of whose precious Blood, spilt in the Bloud of his Servants; and of the Blood of Millions spilt in former and later Wars for Conscience sake, that most Bloody Tenent of Persecution for cause of Conscience, upon, a second Tryal is found more apparently and more notoriously guilty, etc. (London, 1652) during his second visit to England. This work reiterated and amplified the arguments in Bloudy Tenent, but it has the advantage of being written in answer to Cotton's A Reply to Mr. Williams his Examination (Publications of the Narragansett Club, vol. ii.).

Other works by Williams include:
 The Hireling Ministry None of Christ's (London, 1652)
 Experiments of Spiritual Life and Health, and their Preservatives (London, 1652; reprinted Providence, 1863)
 George Fox Digged out of his Burrowes (Boston, 1676) (discusses Quakerism with its different belief in the "inner light," which Williams considered heretical)

A volume of his letters is included in the Narragansett Club edition of Williams' Works (7 vols., Providence, 1866–74), and a volume was edited by J. R. Bartlett (1882).
 The Correspondence of Roger Williams, 2 vols., Rhode Island Historical Society, 1988, edited by Glenn W. LaFantasie.

Brown University's John Carter Brown Library has long housed a 234-page volume referred to as the "Roger Williams Mystery Book". The margins of this book are filled with notations in handwritten code, believed to be the work of Roger Williams. In 2012, Brown University undergraduate Lucas Mason-Brown cracked the code and uncovered conclusive historical evidence attributing its authorship to Williams. Translations are revealing transcriptions of a geographical text, a medical text, and 20 pages of original notes addressing the issue of infant baptism. Mason-Brown has since discovered more writings by Williams employing a separate code in the margins of a rare edition of the Eliot Indian Bible.

Legacy

Williams' defense of the Native Americans, his accusations that Puritans had reproduced the "evils" of the Anglican Church, and his insistence that England pay the Native Americans for their land all put him at the center of many political debates during his life. He was considered an important historical figure of religious liberty at the time of American independence, and he was a key influence on the thinking of the Founding Fathers.

Tributes
Tributes to Williams include:
 The 1936 commemorative Rhode Island Tercentenary half dollar
 Roger Williams National Memorial, a park in downtown Providence established in 1965
 Roger Williams Park, Providence, Rhode Island, and the Roger Williams Park Zoo
 Roger Williams University in Bristol, Rhode Island
 Roger Williams Dining Hall at the University of Rhode Island
 Roger Williams Inn, the main dining hall at the American Baptists' Green Lake Conference Center, founded in 1943 in Green Lake, Wisconsin
Roger Williams Medical Center, a hospital in Providence
 Rhode Island's representative statue in the National Statuary Hall Collection in the United States Capitol, added in 1872
 A depiction of him on the International Monument to the Reformation in Geneva, along with other prominent reformers
 Roger Williams Middle School, a public school in Providence
Pembroke College in Brown University was named for Williams' alma mater

Slate Rock

Slate Rock, a prominent boulder on the west shore of the Seekonk River (near the current Gano Park) was once one of Providence's most important historic landmarks. The rock was believed to be the spot where the Narragansetts greeted Williams with the famous phrase "What cheer, netop?" The historic rock was accidentally blown up by city workers in 1877. They were attempting to expose a buried portion of the stone, but used too much dynamite and the stone was "blasted to pieces." A memorial in Roger Williams Square commemorates the location.

Notable descendants 
These are some descendants of Roger Williams:
 Sen. Nelson W. Aldrich
Gail Borden
Bill Gore
Julia Ward Howe
Kennett Love
 Gov. Sarah Palin
Michelle Phillips (folk/rock star, actress)
 Bishop Alonzo Potter
H. C. Potter (Director)
 Bishop Henry Codman Potter
 Bishop Horatio Potter
Trevor Potter
David Rockefeller
John D. Rockefeller III
Laurence Rockefeller
 Vice President Nelson Rockefeller
 Gov. Winthrop Rockefeller
 Baroness Pauline de Rothschild
Charles Eugene Tefft

See also
 Colony of Rhode Island and Providence Plantations
 Rhode Island
 List of early settlers of Rhode Island
 John Cotton (puritan)
 John Winthrop
 Joseph Kinnicutt Angell
 Roger Williams National Memorial
 Roger Williams Park

References

59.Popular History of New England Volume 1 Published 1880 By Crocker & CO. Publishers in Boston Page 399

Further reading
 Barry, John, Roger Williams and the Creation of the American Soul (New York: Viking Press, 2012). 
 Bejan, Teresa, Mere Civility: Disagreement and the Limits of Toleration (Cambridge, MA: Harvard University Press, 2017). Addresses Roger Williams' ideas in dialogue with Hobbes and Locke, and suggests lessons from Williams for how to disagree well in the modern public sphere. 
 Brockunier, Samuel. The Irrepressible Democrat, Roger Williams, (1940), popular biography 
 Burrage, Henry S. "Why Was Roger Williams Banished?" American Journal of Theology 5 (January 1901): 1–17.
 Byrd, James P., Jr. The Challenges of Roger Williams: Religious Liberty, Violent Persecution, and the Bible (2002). 286 pp.
 Davis. Jack L. "Roger Williams among the Narragansett Indians", New England Quarterly, Vol. 43, No. 4 (Dec. 1970), pp. 593–604 in JSTOR
 Davis, James Calvin. The Moral Theology of Roger Williams: Christian Conviction and Public Ethics. (London: Westminster John Knox, 2004).
 Field, Jonathan Beecher. "A Key for the Gate: Roger Williams, Parliament, and Providence", New England Quarterly 2007 80(3): 353–382
 Fisher, Linford D., and J. Stanley Lemons, and Lucas Mason-Brown. Decoding Roger Williams: The Lost Essay of Rhode Island’s Founding Father. (Waco, TX: Baylor University Press, 2014).
 Goodman, Nan. "Banishment, Jurisdiction, and Identity in Seventeenth-Century New England: The Case of Roger Williams", Early American Studies, An Interdisciplinary Journal Spring 2009, Vol. 7 Issue 1, pp. 109–139.
Gaustad, Edwin, S. Roger Williams (Oxford University Press, 2005). 140 pp. short scholarly biography stressing religion
Gaustad, Edwin, S. Roger Williams: Prophet of Liberty (Oxford University Press, 2001).
 Gaustad, Edwin, S., Liberty of Conscience: Roger Williams in America. (Judson Press, Valley Forge, 1999).
 Gray, Nicole. “Aurality in Print: Revisiting Roger Williams's A Key into the Language of America.” PMLA/Publications of the Modern Language Association of America 131 (2016): 64–83.
 Hall, Timothy L. Separating Church and State: Roger Williams and Religious Liberty (1998). 206 pp.
 Johnson, Alan E. The First American Founder: Roger Williams and Freedom of Conscience (Pittsburgh, PA: Philosophia Publications, 2015). In-depth discussion of Roger Williams's life and work and his influence on the US Founders and later American history. 
 Miller, Perry, Roger Williams, A Contribution to the American Tradition, (1953). much debated study; Miller argues that Williams thought was primarily religious, not political as so many of the historians of the 1930s and 1940s had argued. 
 Morgan, Edmund S. Roger Williams: the church and the state (1967) 170 pages; short biography by leading scholar
 Neff, Jimmy D. "Roger Williams: Pious Puritan and Strict Separationist", Journal of Church and State 1996 38(3): 529–546 in EBSCO
 Phillips, Stephen. "Roger Williams and the Two Tables of the Law", Journal of Church and State 1996 38(3): 547–568 in EBSCO
 Rowley, Matthew. “'All Pretend an Holy War: Radical Beliefs and the Rejection of Persecution in the Mind of Roger Williams', The Review of Faith & International Affairs  15.2 (2017):66–76.
 Skaggs, Donald. Roger Williams' Dream for America (1993). 240 pp.
 Stanley, Alison. "'To Speak With Other Tongues': Linguistics, Colonialism and Identity in 17th Century New England", Comparative American Studies March 2009, Vol. 7 Issue 1, p. 1, 17 pp
 Winslow, Ola Elizabeth, Master Roger Williams, A Biography. (1957) standard biography
 Wood, Timothy L. "Kingdom Expectations: The Native American in the Puritan Missiology of John Winthrop and Roger Williams", Fides et Historia 2000 32(1): 39–49

Historiography
 Carlino, Anthony O. "Roger Williams and his Place in History: The Background and the Last Quarter Century", Rhode Island History 2000 58(2): 34–71, historiography
 Irwin, Raymond D. "A Man for all Eras: The Changing Historical Image of Roger Williams, 1630–1993", Fides Et Historia 1994 26(3): 6–23, historiography
Morgan, Edmund S. " Miller's Williams", New England Quarterly, Vol. 38, No. 4 (Dec. 1965), pp. 513–523 in JSTOR
 Moore, Leroy, Jr. "Roger Williams and the Historians", Church History 1963 32(4): 432–451 in JSTOR
 Peace, Nancy E. "Roger Williams: A Historiographical Essay", Rhode Island History 1976 35(4): 103–113,

Primary sources
 Williams, Roger. The Complete Writings of Roger Williams, 7 vols. 1963
 Williams, Roger. The Correspondence of Roger Williams, 2 vols. ed. by Glenn W. LaFantasie, 1988

Fiction
 Settle, Mary Lee, I, Roger Williams: A Novel, W. W. Norton & Company, Reprint edition (2002).
 George, James W., The Prophet and the Witch: A Novel of Puritan New England, Amazon Digital Services (2017).

External links

 
 
 
  
 Side of the US-American Roger Williams circle of friends
 Documentary about Roger Williams life: Roger Williams – Freedom's Forgotten Hero (Part 1 to 7)
 Lecture by Martha Nussbaum: Equal Liberty of Conscience: Roger Williams and the Roots of a Constitutional Tradition
  Roger Williams Hireling Ministry None of Christ's
 Chronological list of Rhode Island leaders 
A Key into the Language of America – digitization of a first edition copy held at the John Carter Brown Library

1603 births
1683 deaths
17th-century American writers
17th-century Baptist ministers from the United States
17th-century Calvinist and Reformed theologians
17th-century English writers
17th-century English male writers
17th-century New England Puritan ministers
Alumni of Pembroke College, Cambridge
American abolitionists
American Calvinist and Reformed theologians
American evangelicals
American sermon writers
Christian abolitionists
Christians from Rhode Island
Clergy from London
Colonial governors of Rhode Island
Hall of Fame for Great Americans inductees
Immigrants to Plymouth Colony
Linguists of Algic languages
Massachusetts colonial-era clergy
People educated at Charterhouse School
People of colonial Rhode Island
Politicians from Providence, Rhode Island
Anglican saints